The Prince of Qin, Li Shimin is a 2005 Chinese television series loosely based on the early life of Li Shimin, who later became Emperor Taizong of the Tang dynasty. It focuses on Li Shimin's romance with Ruoxi, a fictitious Sui Dynasty princess.

Cast

 Peter Ho as Li Shimin
 Gao Yuanyuan as Yang Ruoxi
 Florence Tan as Zhangsun Long'er
 Yan Kuan as Li Jiancheng
 Bao Jianfeng as Wei Zheng
 Alyssa Chia as Yanzhi
 Lin Jiangguo as Li Yuanji
 Lü Xing as Liu Wenjing
 Yue Yueli as Li Yuan
 Gua Ah-leh as Empress Dou
 Wang Gang as Zhangsun Wuji
 Hei Zi as Yang Guang
 Xu Shouqin as Yuwen Huaji
 Wang Ning as Yuwen Chengdu
 Liu Weihua as Dou Jiande
 Li Qian as Dou Hongxian
 Chen Xianzheng as Huo Tianxing
 Fang Yuan as Haitang
 Han Zhenhua as Yuwen Kai
 Li Chongchong as Yuwen Jianling
 Jiang Hong as Lady Wu
 Chen Tao as Yuchi Gong
 Zhang Yapeng as Cheng Yaojin
 Wu Qiang as Wei Ting
 Yan Qingyu as Empress Xiao
 Gao Ziqi as Qin Shubao

External links
  The Prince of Qin, Li Shimin on Sina.com

2005 Chinese television series debuts
Television series set in the Tang dynasty
Television series set in the Sui dynasty
Mandarin-language television shows
Chinese historical television series
Cultural depictions of Emperor Taizong of Tang